Orlando H. Garrido (born 1 March 1931) is a Cuban biologist and former tennis player.

A native of Havana, Garrido was a University of Miami collegiate player and represented 
Cuba in the Davis Cup from 1950 to 1959. He featured in the singles main draw at Wimbledon five times and in 1956 made the fourth round in mixed doubles. In 1959 he was beaten by his brother Reynaldo in the singles final of the Canadian championships.

Garrido, a renowned naturalist, is credited with the description of over 100 birds, insect taxa and reptiles.

See also
List of Cuba Davis Cup team representatives

References

External links
 
 
 

1931 births
Living people
Cuban male tennis players
Cuban biologists
Miami Hurricanes men's tennis players
People from Havana
Tennis players at the 1955 Pan American Games
Tennis players at the 1959 Pan American Games
Pan American Games competitors for Cuba